József Csábi (born 14 February 1967) is a Hungarian football manager and former player, who was formerly the interim head coach of the national team of Hungary for one match in 2013, following the dismissal of Sándor Egervári.

References

1967 births
Living people
People from Szolnok
Hungarian footballers
Hungary international footballers
Hungarian football managers
Association football defenders
Budapesti VSC footballers
Expatriate footballers in Israel
Szolnoki MÁV FC footballers
Budapest Honvéd FC players
Hapoel Kfar Saba F.C. players
MTK Budapest FC players
Vasas SC managers
Hungary national football team managers
Budapest Honvéd FC managers
Hungarian expatriate footballers
Hungarian expatriate sportspeople in Israel
Nemzeti Bajnokság I players
Liga Leumit players
Sportspeople from Jász-Nagykun-Szolnok County